In enzymology, a glucosamine kinase is an enzyme that catalyzes the chemical reaction

ATP + D-glucosamine  ADP + D-glucosamine phosphate

Thus, the two substrates of this enzyme are ATP and D-glucosamine, whereas its two products are ADP and D-glucosamine phosphate.

This enzyme belongs to the family of transferases, specifically those transferring phosphorus-containing groups (phosphotransferases) with an alcohol group as acceptor.  The systematic name of this enzyme class is ATP:D-glucosamine phosphotransferase. Other names in common use include glucosamine kinase (phosphorylating), ATP:2-amino-2-deoxy-D-glucose-6-phosphotransferase, and aminodeoxyglucose kinase.  This enzyme participates in aminosugars metabolism.

References

 

EC 2.7.1
Enzymes of unknown structure